Blokkøya is an island in the southwestern part of Scareholmane, an island group in Thousand Islands, an archipelago south of Edgeøya.

References

 Norwegian Polar Institute Place Names of Svalbard Database

Islands of Svalbard